Mike Pokrovsky (born 2 February 1953) is a former Australian rules footballer who played with Footscray in the Victorian Football League (VFL).

Pokrovsky was a defender from St Albans, who played mostly as a back pocket. He won a Gardiner Medal in 1972 but only appeared in three senior games for Footscray. After leaving the club he played with Sunshine.

References

1953 births
Australian rules footballers from Victoria (Australia)
Western Bulldogs players
Sunshine Football Club (VFA) players
Living people